Jingxi Subdistrict is a subdistrict in Sanyuan District, Sanming, Fujian province, China. , it administers two residential neighborhoods and two villages:
Neighborhoods
Jingxi Community
Jingdong Community

Villages
Jingxi Village
Jingdong Village

See also 
 List of township-level divisions of Fujian

References 

Township-level divisions of Fujian
Sanming
Subdistricts of the People's Republic of China